The 2006 Twenty20 Cup was the fourth competing of the Twenty20 Cup competition for English and Welsh county clubs. The finals day took place on 12 August at Trent Bridge, Nottingham, and was won by the Leicestershire Foxes.

Fixtures and results

Group stage

Midlands/Wales/West Division

North Division

South Division

Knockout stage

References

See also
Twenty20 Cup

Twenty20 Cup
Twenty20 Cup